Szopienice-Burowiec is a district of Katowice, Poland, located in the north-eastern part of the city. It has an area of 8.47 km2 and in 2007 had 17,139 inhabitants.

The area of a district encompasses two historically important settlements: Roździeń and Szopienice.

Shortly after the German invasion of Poland, which started World War II in September 1939, a unit of the German Einsatzgruppe I was stationed in Szopienice. It was responsible for many crimes against Poles committed in the nearby cities of Będzin, Dąbrowa Górnicza and Sosnowiec. During the subsequent German occupation, the occupiers also established and operated the E734 forced labour subcamp of the Stalag VIII-B/344 prisoner-of-war camp in Szopienice. The occupation ended in 1945.

Notable people 
 Hilary Krzysztofiak (1926–1979), Polish painter, graphic artist and set designer
 Piotr Libera (b. 1951), Roman Catholic bishop

Gallery

References

Districts of Katowice